Puya nana is a species in the genus Puya. This species is endemic to Bolivia.

References

nana
Flora of Bolivia